José Antonio Pestana Figueira, known as Tony Figueira (born 1 August 1981) is a Venezuela-born Portuguese retired football player.

Club career
He made his professional debut in the Primeira Liga for Marítimo on 27 May 2001, when he came on as a 75th-minute substitute for Musa Shannon in a 0–1 loss against Sporting.

References

1981 births
Footballers from Caracas
Venezuelan footballers
Portuguese footballers
Venezuelan people of Portuguese descent
Venezuelan emigrants to Portugal
Living people
C.S. Marítimo players
Primeira Liga players
C.F. União players
Liga Portugal 2 players
C.D. Santa Clara players
S.C. Freamunde players
A.D. Camacha players
Association football midfielders